The Norman Aviation Nordic VII is a Canadian advanced ultralight aircraft, that was designed by Jacques Norman and produced by Norman Aviation of Saint-Anselme, Quebec. The aircraft was supplied as a kit for amateur construction or as a complete ready-to-fly-aircraft.

Production is complete and the Nordic VII is no longer available.

Design and development
The Nordic VII was designed to comply with the Canadian ultralight rules. It features a strut-braced high-wing, a two-seats-in-side-by-side configuration enclosed cockpit with doors, fixed conventional landing gear and a single engine in tractor configuration.

The aircraft fuselage is made from welded steel tubing, with its wings made from wood and all surfaces covered in doped aircraft fabric. The wing is supported by V-struts and jury struts. The standard engines supplied were  Subaru EA four-stroke powerplants.

The Nordic VII also has a swept tail, which differentiates it from the Nordic VI. The wing has slightly greater span than the Nordic VI, but less area, giving the Nordic VII a  higher stall speed and a lower rate of climb, but a faster cruise speed.

Construction time from the factory supplied kit is estimated at 300 hours.

Operational history
In November 2016 there were two Nordic VIIs on the Transport Canada Civil Aviation Register.

Specifications (Nordic VII)

References

External links

1990s Canadian ultralight aircraft
Homebuilt aircraft
Single-engined tractor aircraft